The University for Continuing Education Krems is an Austrian university specializing in further education for working professionals. It is located in Krems an der Donau, Lower Austria.

Name
The Austrian Ministry of Education, Science and Research calls the university the Danube University Krems in English and the Legal Information System of the Republic of Austria calls the university the University of Continuing Education Krems in the English translation of the Universities Act 2002.

History
The first 93 students enrolled in 1995, when the institution began operation with programs in European Studies and journalism. In 2004, the Austrian parliament passed the Danube University Act (DUK-Gesetz) granting the institution the rights of a full university (such as appointing its own professors). More than 27,000 students have graduated from the university.

Courses

The University for Continuing Education Krems has specialized in further education of working professionals. It currently offers more than 200 academic courses and degree programs (leading to Master's degrees) in the fields:
 Medicine, Health and Social Services
 Economics and Business Management
 Law, Administration and International Affairs
 Education, Media and Communication
 Arts, Culture and Building

Students
Today, more than 8,000 students (average age: 40 years) from over 90 countries study at the university. 26 percent of the students come from foreign countries.

Campus

The University for Continuing Education Krems is located in the Wachau region along the Danube, which has been named a world cultural heritage site by the UNESCO. A renovated tobacco factory dating back to the onset of the 20th century and new buildings on Campus Krems provide students and educators room for research and studying. The design for the new buildings is the creation of architect Dietmar Feichtinger, who places a new façade of steel, glass and aluminium opposite the industrial building from the previous century.

Organisation

Faculties and departments

Faculty of Health and Medicine

Departments:
 Health Sciences and Biomedicine
 Evidence-based Medicine and Clinical Epidemiology
 Interdisciplinary Dentistry
 Clinical Neurosciences and Preventive Medicine
 Psychotherapy and Biopsychosocial Health

Faculty of Business and Globalization

Departments:
 Management and Economics
 Legal Studies and International Relations
 E-Governance and Administration
 Migration and Globalization
 Knowledge and Communication Management
 European Policy and the Study of Democracy

Faculty of Education, Arts and Architecture

Departments:
 Continuing Education Research and Educational Management
 Interactive Media and Educational Technologies
 Arts and Image Science
 Building and Environment

Vice-chancellor
On 2 February 2007, vice-chancellor Helmut Kramer resigned due to "conceptional differences on strategic leadership". In May 2007 Heinrich Kern was assigned new vice-chancellor. The interim vice-chancellor, Ada Pellert, who also had applied, was not considered on the shortlist of three by the nomination committee. This was followed by protests in the university senate claiming the decision to be gender-discriminating.

On 8 August 2007, the university issued a statement that the discussions on the vice-chancellor's nomination are based on structural problems in the university. The university decided to split the organisation into two universities. Kern and Pellert were asked to apply for the positions of the two universities' vice-chancellors.

In July 2008 deputy vice-chancellors Ada Pellert and Hanna Risku resigned. In August 2008, vice-chancellor Heinrich Kern resigned according to an agreement with the university council. Former deputy vice-chancellor Jürgen Willer was elected new vice-chancellor. Willer took office in January 2009. He resigned from the office in September 2012.
In its session held on 20 February 2013, the University Council elected Friedrich Faulhammer, former general secretary of the Federal Ministry for Science and Research, to become its new vice-chancellor. Faulhammer has been in office since August 1, 2013.

References

External links
 

University for Continuing Education Krems
Educational institutions established in 1995
Buildings and structures in Lower Austria
Education in Lower Austria
1995 establishments in Austria
Krems an der Donau